Francesco II Crispo (died 1463) was the sixteenth Duke of the Archipelago, ruling for less than one year in 1463 when he succeeded his uncle William II Crispo (r. 1453-63). He was succeeded in 1463 by his son Giacomo III Crispo under the regency of his widow Petronilla Bembo.

Family
He was married to Petronilla Bembo and had issue: 

 Giacomo III Crispo 
 Giovanni III Crispo

References

15th-century Venetian people
Francesco 02
Francesco 02
Year of birth unknown
1463 deaths